I Am a Strange Loop is a 2007 book by Douglas Hofstadter, examining in depth the concept of a strange loop to explain the sense of "I". The concept of a strange loop was originally developed in his 1979 book Gödel, Escher, Bach.

Hofstadter had previously expressed disappointment with how Gödel, Escher, Bach, which won the Pulitzer Prize in 1980 for general nonfiction, was received.  In the preface to its 20th anniversary edition, Hofstadter laments that the book was perceived as a hodgepodge of neat things with no central theme. He states: "GEB is a very personal attempt to say how it is that animate beings can come out of inanimate matter. What is a self, and how can a self come out of stuff that is as selfless as a stone or a puddle?"

Hofstadter seeks to remedy this problem in I Am a Strange Loop by focusing on and expounding the central message of Gödel, Escher, Bach. He demonstrates how the properties of self-referential systems, demonstrated most famously in Gödel's incompleteness theorems, can be used to describe the unique properties of minds.

As an exploration of the sense of "I", Hofstadter explores his own life and those to whom he has been close.

Editions

See also 
 Feedback loop
 Phenomenology (philosophy)
 Identity: in particular, the Ship of Theseus paradox
 Russell's paradox

References 

2007 non-fiction books
Science books
Cognitive science literature
Books by Douglas Hofstadter
Basic Books books
Self